was a Japanese samurai of the late Edo period who succeeded Tokugawa Yoshiyori as incumbent to the Tayasu-Tokugawa headship.

1860 births
1865 deaths
Samurai
Tokugawa clan